El Monte Golf Course Clubhouse is a historic building in Ogden, Utah. It was built in 1934–1935, and designed in the American Craftsman style by architect Eber F. Piers. It has been listed on the National Register of Historic Places since April 1, 1985.

References

	
National Register of Historic Places in Weber County, Utah
Buildings and structures completed in 1934
1934 establishments in Utah